Monga Yao Hui (original title: 艋舺燿輝) is a 2011 Taiwanese television series starring Lee Wei and Shara Lin. It tells the story of four childhood friends and the life of gangsters. The production was announced on 11 January 2011, and  debut on CTS on April 12, 2011, airing every Monday through Fridays at 8:00pm for two hours. The drama marked the 40th anniversary of CTS in producing drama. It was set to end on July 19 but was extended to July 22 due to problems with its replacement, New My Fair Princess.

Lee Wang Luo was nominated for Best Supporting Actor in 2011 at the 46th Golden Bell Awards

Plot
The story begins about the childhood memories between Chen Yao Hui and his mother, along with his sworn friends, Liu Wen Hao, Xu Fuchen, and Yu Hui Fang. Since in the final episode of the first seasons, Chen Yao Hui lost his memories while taken revenge to the driver who was hired by the gangster group of "Tian Kui" murder his mother on the street. In further episodes, Yao Hui was cheated by the Tian Kui members, saying that the San Lian was the suspect who plan to murder his Yao Hui's mother, until Yao Hui regains their trust, he accept to recruit Tian Kui members to against the leader of San Lian, Jiang Yilang.

Until the semi final episodes, Yao Hui regains his old memories trying to remember his origins and his true friends. When Yao Hui remembered his personal members was San Lian, Yao Hui plans to become the spy and he believes that he can overthrown the leader of Tian Kui, Liu Jin Bao.

Cast

International broadcast

References

Taiwanese drama television series
2011 Taiwanese television series debuts
2011 Taiwanese television series endings
Chinese Television System original programming